The 1966 All-Southwest Conference football team consists of American football players chosen by various organizations for All-Southwest Conference teams for the 1966 NCAA University Division football season.  The selectors for the 1966 season included the Associated Press (AP).

All Southwest selections

Offense

Quarterbacks
 Mac White, SMU (AP)

Halfbacks
 Wendell Housley, Texas A&M (AP)
 Chris Gilbert, Texas (AP) (CHFOF)

Fullbacks
 Lester Lehman, Rice (AP)

Ends
 Larry Gilbert, Texas Tech (AP)
 Jerry LeVias, SMU (AP) (CFHOF)

Tackles
 Mo Moorman, Texas A&M (AP)
 Dick Cunningham, Arkansas (AP)
 George Gaiser, SMU (AP)

Guards
 Lynn Thornhill, SMU (AP)
 Howard Goad, Texas (AP)

Centers
 Melvin Gibbs, Arkansas (AP)

Defense

Defensive ends
 Hartford Hamilton, Arkansas (AP)
 Corby Robertson, Texas (AP)

Defensive tackles
 Loyd Phillips, Arkansas (AP) (CFHOF)
 Mike Bratcher, TCU (AP)

Defensive guards
 Greg Pipes, Baylor (AP)
 John LaGrone, SMU (AP)

Linebackers
 Billy Bob Stewart, SMU (AP)
 Jerry Griffin, SMU (AP)

Defensive halfbacks
 Frank Horak, TCU (AP)
 Martine Bercher, Arkansas (AP)

Safeties
 Chuck Latourette, Rice (AP)

Key
AP = Associated Press

CFHOF = Player inducted into the College Football Hall of Fame

See also
1966 College Football All-America Team

References

All-Southwest Conference
All-Southwest Conference football teams